Edward Donnelly may refer to:

 Edward Terence Donnelly (1871–1929), United States Army officer
 J. Edward Donnelly, American football coach and college athletics administrator
 Ed Donnelly (1910s pitcher) (1879–1957), 1910–1911 Boston Braves baseball pitcher
 Ed Donnelly (1950s pitcher) (1932–1992), 1959 Chicago Cubs baseball pitcher